Palangabad (also Romanized as Palangābād; also known as Palangī) is a village in Fathabad Rural District, in the Central District of Baft County, Kerman Province, Iran. At the 2006 census, its population was 27, in 9 families.

References 

Populated places in Baft County